Ghutan may refer to: 

Ghutan (film), a 2007 Indian horror film
Ghutan (TV series), an Indian TV series first broadcast in 2007